Armeno-Kipchak (Xıpçaχ tili, bizim til, Tatarça) was a Turkic language belonging to Kipchak branch of the family that was spoken in Crimea during the 14–15th centuries. The language has been documented from the literary monuments of 16–17th centuries written in Polish-Lithuanian Commonwealth (modern day Ukraine) in the Armenian script. Armeno-Kipchak resembles the language of Codex Cumanicus, which was compiled in the 13th century.

Speakers of the Armeno-Kipchak are considered to be linguistically assimilated Armenians (Armeno-Kipchaks). Armeno-Kipchaks generally identified as Armenian.

See also 

 Karaim language
 Armenians in Ukraine
 Armenians in Poland

References 

Agglutinative languages
Kipchak languages
Armenian languages
Extinct languages of Europe